The Foreigners (Protected Areas) Order, 1958 states that a Protected Area Permit (PAP) is required for non-Indian citizens to visit certain areas in India (mainly in the Northeast India). Certain requirements have to be fulfilled in order to get this permit. Indian citizens who are not resident in these areas need an Inner Line Permit (ILP) to enter these places. The Inner Line Permit is significantly easier to get.

In addition, the Foreigners (Restricted Areas) Order, 1963 states that a Restricted Area Permit (RAP) is required for non-Indians to visit certain areas in India. As of 2009, RAP are required for all visits to the union territory of the Andaman and Nicobar Islands and parts of the state of Sikkim. Unlike PAP, RAP are generally available for individual travellers and can be issued by overseas embassies or even, in some cases such as Port Blair's Veer Savarkar International Airport, on the spot. Indian citizens do not need special permission to visit restricted areas.

List of Protected and Restricted Areas

As of 2018:

Protected Areas
 Whole of Arunachal Pradesh
 Parts of Himachal Pradesh
 Parts of Jammu & Kashmir
 Whole of Manipur
 Whole of Mizoram
 Whole of Nagaland
 Parts of Rajasthan
 Whole of Sikkim (partly in Protected Area and partly in Restricted Area)
 Parts of Uttarakhand

Restricted Areas
 All of Andaman and Nicobar Islands 
 Parts of Sikkim

Formerly Protected or Restricted Areas
 All of Manipur
 All of Mizoram
 All of Nagaland
 All of Lakshadweep
 Parts of Ladakh

As per the Circular issued by the Ministry of Home Affairs and dated 30 December 2010, the entire area of the States of Manipur, Mizoram and Nagaland has been excluded from the Protected Area regime notified under the Foreigners (Protected Areas) Order 1958, initially for a period of one year with effect from 1 January 2011, subject to some conditions. The exemption was extended to 31 December 2012 by MHA vide MHA ID Note No.13/6/99-NE.II Vol.V dated 23 March 2012.

General Protected Area Permit requirements
 Tourists have to travel in groups of at least 2
 They have to travel with a registered travel agent
 In some areas only certain entry/exit points are allowed. In certain areas non-Indians cannot enter at all
 Citizens of Pakistan, Bangladesh, China and Myanmar can get the PAP only with approval of the Ministry of Home Affairs
Normally the PAP has a duration of 10 days, with the option of extending for another 7 days.
The PAP is issued by the Ministry of Home Affairs. However, the different authorities of the concerned Indian states can also issue the PAP, and also the Indian missions abroad. Normally the travel agent will take care of getting the PAP for the tourists.

Problems
At the moment only a touristic visit is a widely accepted purpose for a non-Indian's visit to a protected area. However, there are also other legitimate reasons why a non-Indian would want to visit these areas, for example if such a person is married to a native person of this area to visit his/her in-laws. As a consequence native people from the concerned areas who are married to a non-Indian or having children of a different nationality cannot settle permanently in their native area with their family because it is not possible to get a permanent permit for their non-Indian family-members.

References

External links
 Bureau of Immigration
 Foreigners (Restricted Areas) Order 1968
 Himachal Pradesh government page on PAP
 Manipur government page on PAP
 Sikkim government page on PAP
 Assam government page with relevant laws

Indian nationality law
Northeast India
Tourism in India
Foreign relations of India